= Philip Capelle =

American pocket billiards author

Philip Bryson Capelle
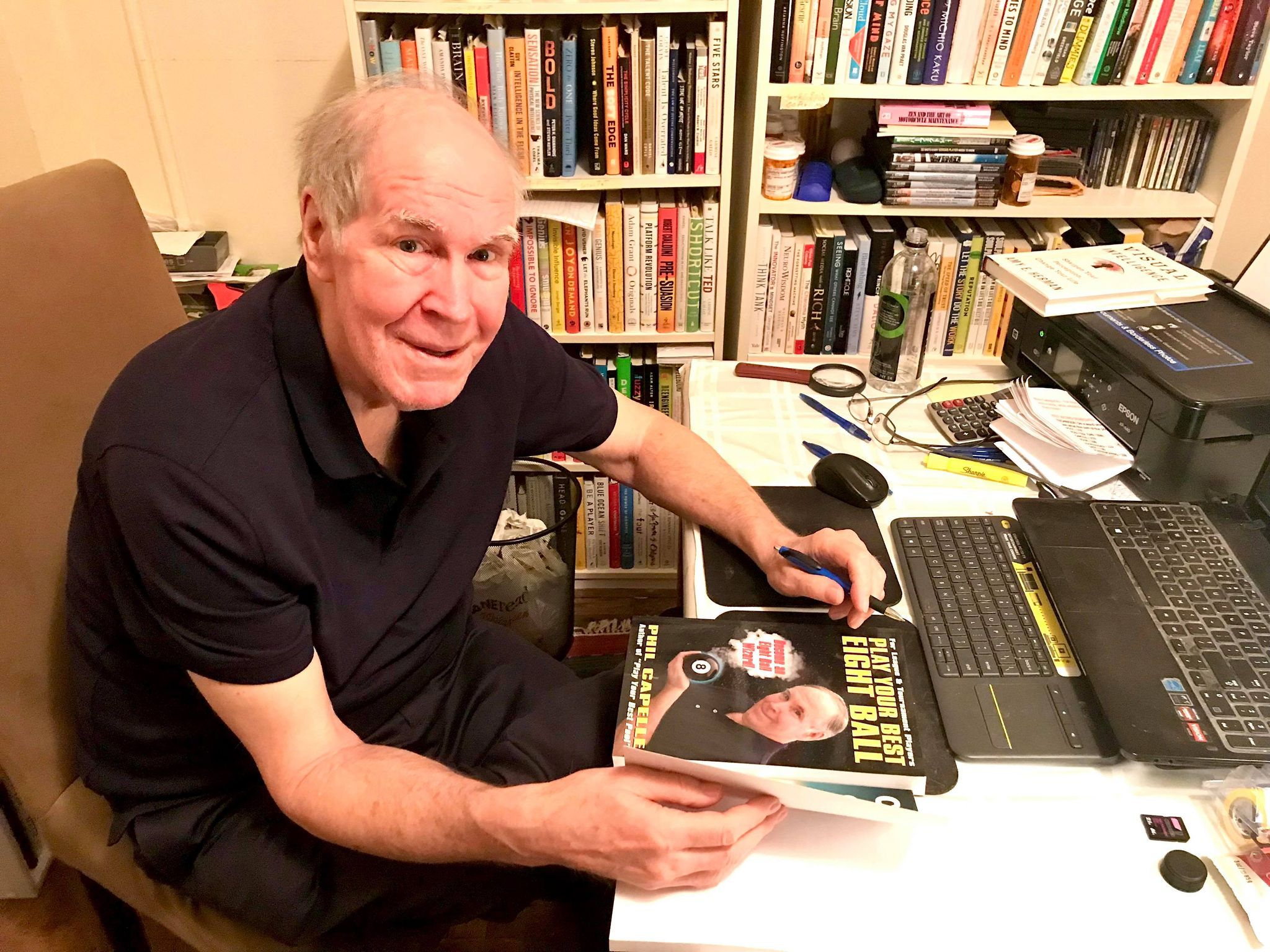
- 2019 photo of Philip Capelle autographing his instructional book on pool for a fan.
- Born: November 26, 1947 (age 78); Needham, Massachusetts
- Other name: Phil
- Education: UC Berkeley (BS in Business Administration)
- Occupations: Journalist and Author
- Spouse: Mariane Miller (m. 1976 d. 1985)
- Writing career
- Period: 1968-present
- Website: billiardspress.com

Philip Bryson Capelle (born November 26, 1947, in Needham, Massachusetts) is an American pocket billiards author, instructor, and columnist. He has been active in pocket billiards media as a journalist providing 300-plus monthly articles for Pool & Billiard Magazine from 1996 to 2021. His instruction and tournament coverage has also appeared in Professor Q-Ball, The Grind, AzBilliards, and most prominently on his Facebook page. He has been covering major pool events for nearly a decade online and in print media and is considered by pool's fourth estate as "pool's number one instructional author." His books have all earned rave reviews from a wide range of pool industry experts.

== Professional career ==
In July 1989, he started writing a weekly column for the Orange County Business Journal. In his first full-length feature, he predicted the 1990s bull market. Other features included lengthy interviews with leading corporate executives in Orange County. As an Orange County Business Journal reporter, he described in an article entitled "California Business" the way Fidelity, after their leveraged buyout of the company, gave them control over costs and the ability to avoid the kinds of losses incurred by competitors.

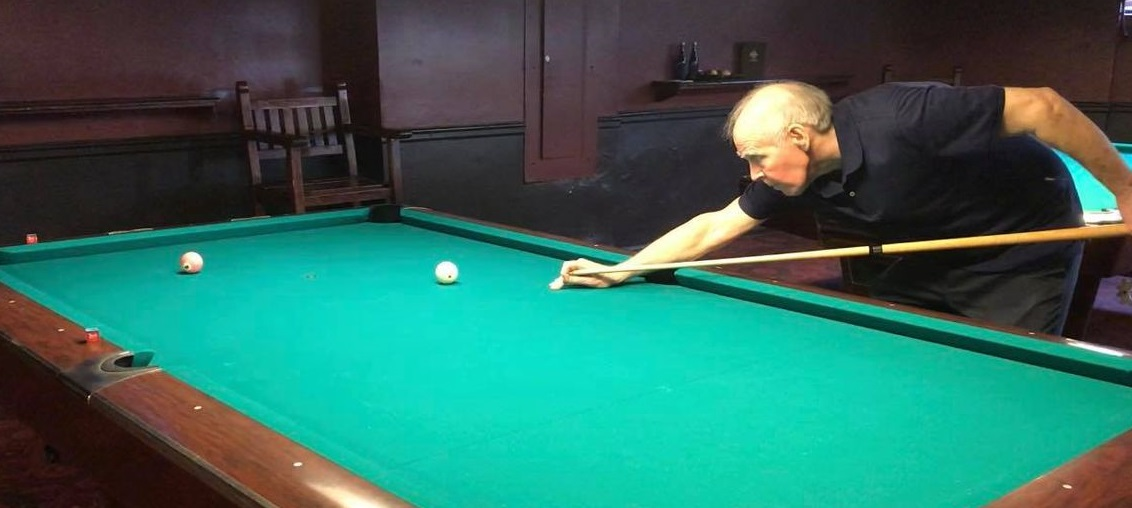
2019 photo of Philip Capelle shooting 9-ball in corner pocket on a professional 9-foot Brunswick Gold Crown.

While at home nursing a dislocated shoulder in the latter half of 1994, Capelle began to seriously consider making a career change. His idea was to turn his passion for pool into a business writing and publishing books on pool. Capelle acquired a team of backers and began work on his first book in January 1995. In December 1995, "Play Your Best Pool," a 480-page tome on all facets of playing pool, was published. The book received rave reviews from each of the leading pool publications, including Pool & Billiard Magazine, Billiards Digest, and The National Billiard News. On page 17 of the June 20, 2020, issue of Billiards Digest, Capelle provided instruction on the break, pool drills, and getting your mental game back after a hiatus from playing pool.

He then took a break from writing pool books to author "Woods vs. Nicklaus: Golf’s Greatest Rivalry." His next book on pool, "Break Shot Patterns," was published in 2011, and two more have followed, bringing his total of billiard books to 12.

== Books ==
- Play Your Best Pool (1995, 2005) ISBN 0-9649204-8-4
- A Mind For Pool (1999) ISBN 0-9649204-1-7
- Play Your Best Straight Pool (2000, 2015)
- Play Your Best 9 & 10-Ball (2001)
- Capelle On 9-Ball (2002)
- Mike Massey's World (2003)
- Play Your Best Eight Ball (2004)
- Capelle's Practicing Pool (2006)
- Break Shot Patterns (2011)
- Six Words to Pool Greatness (2016, 2021)
- Capelle's Columns (2017)
- Capelle's Columns Volume II (2021)
